

Hermann Flörke (23 October 1893 – 19 August 1979) was a German general during World War II who commanded the 14th Infantry Division. He was  a recipient of the  Knight's Cross of the Iron Cross with Oak Leaves.

Awards and decorations
 Iron Cross (1914) 2nd Class (15 June 1915) & 1st Class (27 August 1917)
 Clasp to the Iron Cross (1939) 2nd Class (15 October 1939) & 1st Class  (21 May 1940)
 German Cross in Gold on 23 October 1942 as Oberst in Infanterie-Regiment 12
 Knight's Cross of the Iron Cross with Oak Leaves
 Knight's Cross on 15 December 1943 as Generalmajor and commander of 14. Infanterie-Division
 565th Oak Leaves on 2 September 1944 as Generalleutnant and commander of 14. Infanterie-Division
 Grand Cross of the Order of Merit of the Federal Republic of Germany (10 March 1967)
 Merit of the Federal Republic of Germany (10 March 1967)

References

Citations

Bibliography

 
 
 

1893 births
1979 deaths
Military personnel from Hanover
People from the Province of Hanover
Lieutenant generals of the German Army (Wehrmacht)
German Army personnel of World War I
Recipients of the Gold German Cross
Recipients of the Knight's Cross of the Iron Cross with Oak Leaves
Commanders Crosses of the Order of Merit of the Federal Republic of Germany
German prisoners of war in World War II held by the United States
Recipients of the clasp to the Iron Cross, 1st class
German Army generals of World War II